The 2015–16 Little Rock Trojans men's basketball team represented the University of Arkansas at Little Rock during the 2015–16 NCAA Division I men's basketball season. The Trojans, led by first-year head coach Chris Beard, played their home games at the Jack Stephens Center in Little Rock, Arkansas and were members of the Sun Belt Conference. They finished the season 30–5, 17–3 in Sun Belt play to win the Sun Belt regular season championship. They defeated Louisiana–Lafayette and Louisiana–Monroe to win the Sun Belt tournament and earn the conference's automatic bid to the NCAA tournament. In the Tournament as a No. 12 seed, they defeated Purdue in the first round before losing in the second round to Iowa State.

This was the first season in which the school used "Little Rock" as its athletic brand; previously, it had alternately used "Arkansas–Little Rock" and "UALR".

Following the season, first-year head coach Chris Beard left the school to accept the head coaching position at Texas Tech. On March 31, 2016, the school hired Wes Flanigan as head coach.

Previous season 
The Trojans finished the 2014–15 season 13–18, 8–12 in Sun Belt play to finish in eighth place. They lost in the first round of the Sun Belt tournament to South Alabama.

On March 18, 2015, head coach Steve Shields was fired. He compiled a record of 192–178 in eight seasons. In early April, the school hired Chris Beard as head coach.

Roster

Schedule and results

 
|-
!colspan=9 style="background:#800000; color:white;"| Exhibition

|-
!colspan=9 style="background:#800000; color:white;"| Regular season

|-
!colspan=9 style="background:#800000; color:white;"| Sun Belt tournament

|-
!colspan=9 style="background:#800000; color:white;"| NCAA tournament

References

Little Rock
Little Rock Trojans men's basketball seasons
Little Rock
TRoj
TRoj